Eastmond is a surname. Notable people with the surname include:

Aalayah Eastmond (born 2001), American activist
Barry Eastmond, American musician, composer, songwriter, and record producer
Craig Eastmond (born 1990), English footballer
Kyle Eastmond (born 1989), English rugby union player